Jucinara Thaís Soares Paz (born 3 August 1993), simply known as Jucinara, is a Brazilian professional footballer who plays as a left back for Brazilian Série A1 club Flamengo.

In June 2022 Jucinara signed for Flamengo after spending five seasons in Spain, with Atlético Madrid, Valencia and Levante.

References

External links 
 

1993 births
Living people
Footballers from Porto Alegre
Brazilian women's footballers
Women's association football fullbacks
Associação Desportiva Centro Olímpico players
Sport Club Corinthians Paulista (women) players
Primera División (women) players
Atlético Madrid Femenino players
Valencia CF Femenino players
Brazil women's international footballers
Brazilian expatriate women's footballers
Brazilian expatriate sportspeople in Spain
Expatriate women's footballers in Spain
Levante UD Femenino players
Footballers at the 2020 Summer Olympics
Olympic footballers of Brazil
Sport Club Internacional (women) players
Clube de Regatas do Flamengo (women) players